Lee Myung-se (born August 20, 1957) is a South Korean filmmaker.

Lee began his career as an assistant producer under Bae Chang-ho for the films Hwang Jin-I (1986), Our Sweet Days of Youth (1988), and Dream (1990). At the 1991 Asia-Pacific Film Festival, he was awarded Best New Director for the film, Naui Sarang Naui Shinbu, and in 1993 won the Special Jury Award for Cheot Sarang.

Other film credits include Nowhere to Hide (1999) and Duelist (2005). Many of his films feature a tragically flawed protagonist. Lee also favors slow-motion fighting sequences.

Filmography 
 Gagman (1989) - writer and director
 The Dream (Ggum; 1990) - writer
 My Love, My Bride (Naui sarang naui sinbu; 1990) - writer and director
 First Love (Cheot sarang; 1993) - writer and director
 Bitter and Sweet (Namjaui goerowe; 1995) - writer and director
 Their Last Love Affair (Jidokhan sarang; 1996) - writer and director
 Nowhere to Hide (Injeong sajeong bol geot eobtda; 1999)  - writer and director
 Duelist (Hyeongsa; 2005) - writer, director and producer
 M (2007) - writer, director and producer

External links 
 
 
 
 Lee Myung-se at Allocine.com 

1957 births
Living people
South Korean film directors
Best Director Paeksang Arts Award (film) winners